Sune Sandbring (10 April 1928 – 1 October 2021) was a Swedish footballer who played his entire career at Malmö FF as a defender.

References

External links

1928 births
2021 deaths
Footballers from Malmö
Association football defenders
Swedish footballers
Sweden international footballers
Allsvenskan players
Malmö FF players